The Judicate of Logudoro or Torres ( or Torres, Rennu de Logudoro or Logu de Torres) was a state in northwest Sardinia from the tenth through the thirteenth century. Its original capital was Porto Torres. The region is still called Logudoro today.

In the Middle Ages, Logudoro was one of four kingdoms (iudicati) into which the island was divided. The others were Gallura to the east, Arborea to the south, and Cagliari to the southeast. Logudoro was the largest and earliest known of the iudicati but also the second to be swallowed up by a foreign power. It was divided into twenty curatoriae, ruled by curatores.

History

In the ninth century, the Arabs and Imazighen followed aggressive policies of expansion and piracy in the Mediterranean. The conquest of Sicily by these groups in 827 effectively cut Sardinia off from the central government and military might of the Byzantine Empire. In the absence of instruction or reinforcement, the Sardinian provincial Byzantine officials, called iudici ("judges") began to govern autonomously. By the tenth century the island was divided into four of these provinces (giudicati, literally, "judgeships"), though two — Logudoro and Arborea — were combined at the start of the eleventh century. The first capital city for the Giudicato of Logudoro was ancient Torres (now Porto Torres), but it was exposed to Arab attacks, and so the seat of the judgeship was transferred first to Ardara, and finally to Sassari.

Logudoro only began to emerge from the fog of history during the reign of Barisone I from about 1038 to 1073. He brought Western monasticism to the island by requesting monks from Abbot Desiderius of Montecassino and in this he was supported by both Pope Alexander II and Godfrey the Bearded, Margrave of Tuscany, though the archdiocese of Pisa, thitherto chief religious influence on the island, opposed it. The monks had spiritual, scholastic and military roles. On the death of Barisone I, Arborea chose its own judge in Marianus de Zori, while the Logudorese chose Andrew Tanca.

The kingdom of Logudoro came to an end in 1259, when the queen Adelasia died without an heir. After this, Logudoro was effectively ruled by the Genoese families of Doria and Malaspina, and the ruling family of Arborea. Sassari meanwhile became an autonomous city-state.

See also
King of Torres

Notes

References

Logudoro
History of Sardinia
Former monarchies of Europe